George Babbitt may refer to:
George T. Babbitt Jr. (born 1942), United States Air Force general
George F. Babbitt, the central character of Babbitt, a 1922 novel by Sinclair Lewis